"Mercedes Tintia" (Spanish for "Tinted Mercedes") is a song by Puerto Rican rapper Anuel AA. The song was released on August 25, 2022, through Real Hasta la Muerte as the second single from Anuel AA's fifth studio album LLNM2.

Background 

A part of the song, known previously as "G5", was leaked in the beginning of August. Later Anuel AA announced that the track with the name "Mercedes Tintia" will come out as the second single of his upcoming album.

Commercial performance 

"Mercedes Tintia" debuted at number 29 on Billboards Hot Latin Songs chart and at number 7 on the US Billboard Latin Digital Song Sales chart. In Spain's official weekly chart, the song debuted at number 59. On the Argentina Hot 100's chart, the song debuted at number 97.

Music video 

The music video for "Mercedes Tintia" was released on August 26, 2022, and produced by TruViews and Anuel AA. It was filmed in Casa de Campo, Dominican Republic and shows Anuel driving a tinted Mercedes. In the music video he also announced his collaboration with Reebok and Foot Locker.

Charts

References 

2022 singles
Anuel AA songs